Pegeen is a 1920 American silent drama film based on the 1915 novel of the same name by Eleanor Hoyt Brainerd. It was produced by Vitagraph Studios and  directed by David Smith. It stars Bessie Love in the title role. The film is presumed lost.

Plot 
Recently widowed Danny O'Neil (Stanley) has the belief that his wife will return to him by way of fire, and sets fire to buildings around town in hope that she will return to him. For her safety, his daughter Pegeen (Love) is sent to live with neighbor. When her father is to be arrested, Pegeen's friend Ezra (McGuire) helps hide her father, who dies shortly thereafter.

Cast

Reception 
Reviews for the film were mixed. Its "worst criticism" is that "it is not a thriller, nor a spectacle. Neither is it a heavy digest of a weighty social or economic problem. It is just a simple story of every day people, told in simple, direct continuity, intelligently and coherently."

Scenes involving a hanging and a shoot-out were recommended for removal when showing the film to family audiences.

References

External links 

 
 
 
 
 Lantern slide

1920 films
1920 drama films
1920 lost films
American black-and-white films
Silent American drama films
American silent feature films
Films about arson
Films based on American novels
Films directed by David Smith (director)
Lost American films
Lost drama films
Vitagraph Studios films
1920s American films